Church of Saint Peter in Banchi is a Roman Catholic church in the city of Genoa, in the Province of Genoa and the region of Liguria, Italy.

Notes

Roman Catholic churches completed in 1585
16th-century Roman Catholic church buildings in Italy
Peter
Renaissance architecture in Liguria